Bucculatrix trifasciella is a moth in the family Bucculatricidae. It was first described by James Brackenridge Clemens in 1866 and is found in North America, where it has been recorded from Maine, New Hampshire, Pennsylvania, New Jersey, Kentucky, Ohio and Ontario.

The larvae feed on Quercus species. They mine the leaves of their host plant.

References

Natural History Museum Lepidoptera generic names catalog

Bucculatricidae
Moths described in 1866
Taxa named by James Brackenridge Clemens
Moths of North America